Hasan Bicaku was an Albanian politician and mayor of Elbasan from 1933 through 1934.

References

Year of birth missing
Year of death missing
Mayors of Elbasan